Kamaritsa (Greek: Καμαρίτσα) may refer to two places in Greece:

Kamaritsa, Arcadia, a settlement of Falaisia in Arcadia 
Kamaritsa, Euboea, a settlement in the municipality Dirfys–Messapia, Euboea